Milt Crain is a former Canadian Football League offensive tackle and center from 1960 to 1964. He became an east division all-star at center for the Montreal Alouettes in 1963.

After playing college football at the University of Mississippi, Milt Crain was drafted by the Baltimore Colts in 1959 but never played a regular season game for them. Instead, he joined the Montreal Alouettes that year but was waived. He returned for another tryout the following year and this time stayed on with them to 1964. Although Crain played as an offensive tackle, he was switched to center in 1963 and was voted at that position as an East All-Star. However, in 1964, the Alouettes had many problems on offense, winding up the season as the lowest scoring team in the east, and he was released after playing only 4 games. Though picked up by the Saskatchewan Roughriders for 1 more game that same year, he never played another season.

References

1937 births
Living people
People from New Albany, Mississippi
Players of American football from Mississippi
Ole Miss Rebels football players
American players of Canadian football
Canadian football offensive linemen
Montreal Alouettes players
Saskatchewan Roughriders players